Zheng Zhenyao is a Chinese film and television actress. Zheng started her career in the theater stage, but rose to fame through her role as a middle-aged lady in Sparkling Red Star (1974). For her performance in My Memories of Old Beijing (1982), Zheng won Golden Rooster Award for Best Supporting Actress. In 2004, she won Golden Rooster Award for Best Actress for Shanghai Story.

Filmography
Sparkling Red Star (1974)
My Memories of Old Beijing (1982)
Taiwan Story (2004)
Shanghai Story (2004)

References

External links
 

1936 births
Living people
Chinese film actresses
Actresses from Anhui
People from Suzhou, Anhui
Chinese stage actresses
Central Academy of Drama alumni
20th-century Chinese actresses
Chinese television actresses
21st-century Chinese actresses